Felice Evacuo (born 23 August 1982) is an Italian former footballer who played as a forward.

Career

Early career
Born in Pompei, the Province of Naples, Evacuo started his professional career at Serie C1 side Turris. In 2001–02 season, he joined Lazio, played at their youth team. Evacuo played his first Serie A match on 27 January 2002, replaced Stefano Fiore in the 77th minute of 1–0 defeat to Torino. He played another match as starter on 17 March, but replaced by Claudio López as half time.

During the 2002–03 season, he left for newly founded Florentia Viola on loan, where he played 20 league matches for La Viola in Serie C2. In the 2003–04 season, he played for Serie C1 side Viterbese.

Avellino
In summer 2004, he left for Serie C1 side Avellino, he scored 8 league goals and won promotion playoffs to Serie B. He played once at Serie B before left for Serie C1 side Torres. In the 2006–07 season, he returned to Avellino, which relegated back to Serie C1 in June 2006. He won promotion playoffs again and scored 15 goals.

Frosinone & Benevento
In July 2007, he signed a three-year contract with Frosinone. He was the second team-top-scorer behind Francesco Lodi. But in August 2008, he left for Prima Divisione side Benevento.

Novara 
On 9 July 2014, Evacuo moved Novara permanently for transfer fee of about €700,000. On 10 May 2015, Novara won the Lega Pro championship and was promoted to Serie B; this victory follows that of the Lega Pro Super Cup.

Parma and Alessandria 
On 6 July 2016, he moved to Parma, newly promoted team in the Lega Pro, signing a two-year contract. On 30 January 2017, it's transferred to Alessandria with temporary annual on loan until 30 June 2017.

Trapani 
In the summer of 2017 he left Alessandria for Trapani, another Serie C club. With Trapani, he achieved promotion to Serie B after winning the 2018–19 Serie C playoffs.

Catanzaro
On 5 October 2020, he joined Catanzaro in Serie C.

Juve Stabia
On 8 September 2021, he signed with Juve Stabia.

Career statistics

Honours
Fiorentina
Serie C2: 2003 (Group B)

Spezia
Supercoppa di Serie C: 2012

Novara
Supercoppa di Serie C: 2015

Individual
 Coppa Italia Co-Top Goalscorer (5 goals): 2010–11

References

External links
 Profile at La Gazzetta dello Sport 2007-08 
 Profile at AIC.Football.it 
 Profile at FIGC 

1982 births
Living people
People from Pompei
Sportspeople from the Province of Naples
Footballers from Campania
Italian footballers
Association football forwards
Serie A players
Serie B players
Serie C players
S.S. Turris Calcio players
S.S. Lazio players
ACF Fiorentina players
U.S. Viterbese 1908 players
U.S. Avellino 1912 players
S.E.F. Torres 1903 players
Frosinone Calcio players
Benevento Calcio players
Spezia Calcio players
A.S.G. Nocerina players
Novara F.C. players
Parma Calcio 1913 players
U.S. Alessandria Calcio 1912 players
Trapani Calcio players
U.S. Catanzaro 1929 players
S.S. Juve Stabia players
Italy youth international footballers